Lee Scott James (born 27 January 1973) is an English ex-professional golfer.

Early life and amateur career
James was born in Poole, Dorset. He won the 1994 Amateur Championship with a 2 & 1 victory over Gordon Sherry.

Professional career
James turned professional in 1995 after the Walker Cup, where he was part of the victories Great Britain and Ireland team.

Having been unsuccessful at gaining a place on the European Tour via qualifying school, James began his professional career on the second tier Challenge Tour, picking up his first win at the 1996 Modena Classic Open. He finally graduated to the elite tour by finishing top of the 2002 Challenge Tour Rankings, with three wins during the season. He was unable to retain his tour card, and returned to the Challenge Tour in 2004.

16th place in the 2006 Challenge Tour Rankings followed by success at final qualifying school in 2007 gave James another two seasons at the top level, but both times he was unable to earn sufficient money to maintain his playing status. In 2009, he won his fifth Challenge Tour title at the Allianz Open Côtes d'Armor Bretagne.

James was reinstated as an amateur in 2016.

Amateur wins
1994 The Amateur Championship

Professional wins (10)

Challenge Tour wins (5)

Challenge Tour playoff record (1–1)

MasterCard Tour wins (2)
1999 Celtic Manor Resort Championship, Hawkstone Park Championship

Other wins (3)
1996 Futures Tour Championship
1998 Futures Tour Championship, Northern Open

Results in major championships

CUT = missed the half-way cut
Note: Phillips only played in The Open Championship.

Team appearances
Amateur
European Boys' Team Championship (representing England): 1991
European Amateur Team Championship (representing England): 1993, 1995
European Youths' Team Championship (representing England): 1994
Eisenhower Trophy (representing Great Britain & Ireland): 1994
St Andrews Trophy (representing Great Britain & Ireland): 1994 (winners)
Walker Cup (representing Great Britain & Ireland): 1995 (winners)

See also
2006 Challenge Tour graduates
2007 European Tour Qualifying School graduates
List of golfers with most Challenge Tour wins

References

External links

English male golfers
European Tour golfers
Sportspeople from Poole
1973 births
Living people